Pablo Andújar was the defending champion but lost in the final to Kamil Majchrzak.

Majchrzak won the title after defeating Andújar 6–2, 7–6(7–5) in the final.

Seeds

Draw

Finals

Top half

Bottom half

References

External links
Main draw
Qualifying draw

Moneta Czech Open - Singles
2020 Singles